Following is the list of the constituencies of the Delhi Legislative Assembly since the delimitation of legislative assembly constituencies in 2008. At present, 12 constituencies are reserved for the candidates belonging to the Scheduled castes.

List of constituencies

References
 

Delhi-related lists
Delhi